Enrique Eduardo Palos Reyes (born 31 May 1986) is a former Mexican professional footballer who played as a goalkeeper.

Club career

Tigres
Palos has spent most of his career as 2nd/3rd goalkeeper until he was given a starting opportunity by Ricardo Ferretti and benching Cirilo Saucedo in 2011. Since then he has become a regular starter on the team for most of the following games. Beginning in Apertura 2014, Palos was demoted to Tigres' backup goalkeeper after Tigres signed Argentina National Football Team player Nahuel Guzman.

Honours
Tigres UANL
Liga MX: Apertura 2011, Apertura 2015, Apertura 2016, Apertura 2017
Copa MX: Clausura 2014
Campeón de Campeones: 2016, 2017
SuperLiga: 2009

Individual
Liga MX Best Goalkeeper of the tournament: Apertura 2011

References

1986 births
Living people
Footballers from Aguascalientes
People from Aguascalientes City
Association football goalkeepers
Liga MX players
Tigres UANL footballers
FC Juárez footballers
Mexican footballers